Wheaton Township is one of twenty-five townships in Barry County, Missouri, United States. As of the 2000 census, its population was 1,138.

Geography

The streams of Joyce Creek, Pogue Creek and Woodward Creek run through this township.

References

 USGS Geographic Names Information System (GNIS)

External links
 US-Counties.com
 City-Data.com

Townships in Barry County, Missouri
Townships in Missouri